An attosecond (symbol as) is a unit of time in the International System of Units (SI) equal to 1×10−18 of a second (one quintillionth of a second). For comparison, an attosecond is to a second what a second is to about 31.71 billion years.

The word "attosecond" is formed by the prefix atto and the unit second. Atto- was derived from the Danish word for eighteen (atten). Its symbol is as.

Because the next higher SI unit for time is the femtosecond (10−15 seconds), durations of 10−17 s and 10−16 s will typically be expressed as tens or hundreds of attoseconds:

Times which can be expressed in attoseconds:
 0.247 attoseconds: travel time of a photon across "the average bond length of molecular hydrogen"
 24 attoseconds: the atomic unit of time
 43 attoseconds: the shortest pulses of laser light yet created
 53 attoseconds: the second-shortest pulses of laser light created
 82 attoseconds (approximately): half-life of beryllium-8, maximum time available for the triple-alpha process for the synthesis of carbon and heavier elements in stars
84 attoseconds: the approximate half-life of a neutral pion
 100 attoseconds: fastest-ever view of molecular motion
 320 attoseconds: estimated time it takes electrons to transfer between atoms

See also
Attosecond physics
Attosecond chronoscopy
Orders of magnitude (time)

References

Orders of magnitude (time)